The 2008–09 Toronto Maple Leafs season was the franchise's 92nd, and their 82nd as the Maple Leafs. The Leafs did not qualify for the playoffs for the fourth consecutive season.

Offseason
The Leafs faced an off-season challenge to hire a general manager. Brian Burke was a favourite for the position held by interim general manager Cliff Fletcher, but Burke opted to stay with the Anaheim Ducks. He was not given permission to talk to the Leafs about their vacancy by Ducks owner Henry Samueli. Burke had one more year left on his contract as the general manager of the Ducks, and those close to him say he was interested in the Maple Leafs' job. 

On May 7, the Leafs fired head coach Paul Maurice, along with two assistant coaches, after missing the playoffs in back-to-back seasons. On May 8, the Leafs asked the Vancouver Canucks permission to speak to Dave Nonis about hiring him for a position with the club.

In mid-May, there were rumours that Wayne Gretzky was in the running for a position with the Maple Leafs. Gretzky responded to the rumours linking him to the Toronto Maple Leafs by stating that his focus was on the Phoenix Coyotes and developing their young talent.

On June 10, Ron Wilson was hired as the new head coach of the Toronto Maple Leafs. Wilson was fired in May by the San Jose Sharks after the Sharks lost to the Dallas Stars in the second round of the NHL playoffs. Wilson has also coached the Anaheim Ducks and the Washington Capitals. The former U.S. college player spent parts of three NHL seasons with the Leafs in the 1970s.

The Toronto Maple Leafs hired Al Coates as their player-personnel director on June 16. Coates comes to Toronto after spending the previous six seasons with Anaheim. Coates has spent more than 30 years in pro hockey and has been part of two Stanley Cup-winning teams (2007 with the Anaheim Ducks and 1989 with the Calgary Flames).

The move perpetuated speculation that Anaheim general manager Brian Burke would become the Maple Leafs' GM once his deal with the Ducks expired in 2009. The fact that new head coach Ron Wilson played hockey with Burke at the Providence College sparked further rumors about Burke potentially joining the club.

Former NHL star Joe Nieuwendyk was named as general manager Cliff Fletcher's special assistant on July 8. While playing for the Florida Panthers, Nieuwendyk gained experience as a special consultant to GM Jacques Martin.

Throughout the off-season, the Maple Leafs have been involved in numerous transactions. On June 24, the Toronto Maple Leafs put goaltender Andrew Raycroft and forward Kyle Wellwood on waivers. Moreover, interim GM Cliff Fletcher informed Darcy Tucker that he is to be bought out of his three-year contract; however, this decision was not made official until June 25.

The Maple Leafs bought out goaltender Andrew Raycroft on June 28, making him eligible for free agency on July 1. When the free agent signing period began on July 1, Toronto signed defenceman Jeff Finger, goaltender Curtis Joseph and former Dallas Stars forward Niklas Hagman. Another transaction was made on July 3 when Toronto traded for former Montreal Canadiens forward Mikhail Grabovski in exchange for the rights to Greg Pateryn and a second-round draft pick in 2010. The Leafs also re-signed forwards Dominic Moore, John Mitchell and Greg Scott. On July 14, the Maple Leafs acquired forward Ryan Hollweg in a trade with the New York Rangers for a fifth-round draft pick in 2009.

Regular season
With a young roster, the Maple Leafs were expected to have a lacklustre season. This proved to be correct, as they fell out of the playoff race relatively early and showed little sign of recovery. However, they showed signs of improvement in February and March 2009, during which they had a stretch of seven consecutive games that went into overtime. The Leafs lost the first two in shootouts, then won four in a row with two overtime wins and two shootout wins, followed by an overtime loss.

In November 2008, Brian Burke obtained his release from the Anaheim Ducks and joined the Maple Leafs as president and general manager.

The Maple Leafs were mathematically eliminated from the playoffs on March 31, 2009, with six games remaining in the season.

The Maple Leafs finished the season with 286 goals allowed (excluding seven shootout goals), the most out of all 30 teams. The Maple Leafs also struggled on the penalty kill, finishing 30th overall in penalty-kill percentage, at 74.68%.

Divisional standings

Conference standings

Schedule and results

|- align="center" bgcolor="#ccffcc"
| 1 || October 9, 2008 || @ Detroit Red Wings || 3–2 || Joe Louis Arena || 20,066 || 1–0–0 || 2
|- align="center" bgcolor="#ffbbbb"
| 2 || October 11, 2008 || Montreal Canadiens || 1–6 || Air Canada Centre || 19,370 || 1–1–0  || 2
|- align="center" bgcolor="#ffffcc"
| 3 || October 13, 2008 || St. Louis Blues || 4–5 (SO) || Air Canada Centre || 19,045 || 1–1–1 || 3
|- align="center" bgcolor="#ffffcc"
| 4 || October 17, 2008 || @ New York Rangers || 0–1 (SO) || Madison Square Garden || 18,200 || 1–1–2 || 4
|- align="center" bgcolor="#ffbbbb"
| 5 || October 18, 2008 || @ Pittsburgh Penguins || 1–4 || Mellon Arena || 17,033 || 1–2–2 || 4
|- align="center" bgcolor="#ffffcc"
| 6 || October 21, 2008 || Anaheim Ducks || 2–3 (SO) || Air Canada Centre || 19,222 || 1–2–3 || 5
|- align="center" bgcolor="#ccffcc"
| 7 || October 23, 2008 || @ Boston Bruins || 4–2 || TD Banknorth Garden || 12,274 || 2–2–3 || 7
|- align="center" bgcolor="#ccffcc"
| 8 || October 25, 2008 || Ottawa Senators || 3–2 || Air Canada Centre || 19,232 || 3–2–3 || 9
|- align="center" bgcolor="#ffbbbb"
| 9 || October 28, 2008 || Tampa Bay Lightning || 2–3 || Air Canada Centre || 19,348 || 3–3–3 || 9
|- align="center" bgcolor="#ccffcc"
| 10 || October 29, 2008 || @ New Jersey Devils || 6–5 (SO) || Prudential Center || 14,119 || 4–3–3 || 11
|-

|- align="center" bgcolor="#ccffcc"
| 11 || November 1, 2008 || New York Rangers || 5–2 || Air Canada Centre || 19,179 || 5–3–3 || 13
|- align="center" bgcolor="#ffbbbb"
| 12 || November 2, 2008 ||  @ Carolina Hurricanes || 4–6 || RBC Center || 15,635 || 5–4–3 || 13
|- align="center" bgcolor="#ffffff"
| 13 || November 4, 2008 || Carolina Hurricanes || 4–5 (OT) || Air Canada Centre || 19,266 || 5–4–4 || 14
|- align="center" bgcolor="#ffbbbb"
| 14 || November 6, 2008 || @ Boston Bruins || 2–5 || TD Banknorth Garden || 15,391 ||5–5–4 || 14
|- align="center" bgcolor="#ccffcc"
| 15 || November 8, 2008 † || Montreal Canadiens || 6–3 || Air Canada Centre || 19,512 || 6–5–4 || 16
|- align="center" bgcolor="#ffbbbb"
| 16 || November 11, 2008 || @ Calgary Flames || 3–4 || Pengrowth Saddledome || 19,289 || 6–6–4 || 16
|- align="center" bgcolor="#ccffcc"
| 17 || November 13, 2008 || @ Edmonton Oilers || 5–2 || Rexall Place || 16,839 || 7–6–4 || 18
|- align="center" bgcolor="#ffbbbb"
| 18 || November 15, 2008 || @ Vancouver Canucks || 2–4 || General Motors Place || 18,630 || 7–7–4 || 18
|- align="center" bgcolor="#ffbbbb"
| 19 || November 17, 2008 || Boston Bruins || 2–3 || Air Canada Centre || 19,410 || 7–8–4 || 18
|- align="center" bgcolor="#ffffff"
| 20 || November 22, 2008 || Chicago Blackhawks || 4–5 (OT) || Air Canada Centre || 19,474 || 7–8–5 || 19
|- align="center" bgcolor="#ffbbbb"
| 21 || November 25, 2008 || Atlanta Thrashers || 3–6 || Air Canada Centre || 19,297 || 7–9–5 || 19
|- align="center" bgcolor="#ffffff"
| 22 || November 27, 2008 || @ Ottawa Senators || 1–2 (SO) || Scotiabank Place || 19,703 || 7–9–6 || 20
|- align="center" bgcolor="#ccffcc"
| 23 || November 29, 2008 || Philadelphia Flyers || 4–2 || Air Canada Centre || 19,387 || 8–9–6 || 22
|-

|- align="center" bgcolor="#ccffcc"
| 24 || December 1, 2008 || @ Los Angeles Kings || 3–1 || Staples Center || 15,052 || 9–9–6 || 24
|- align="center" bgcolor="#ffbbbb"
| 25 || December 2, 2008 || @ San Jose Sharks || 2–5 || HP Pavilion at San Jose || 17,496 || 9–10–6 || 24
|- align="center" bgcolor="#ffbbbb"
| 26 || December 4, 2008 || @ Phoenix Coyotes || 3–6 || Jobing.com Arena || 13,777 ||9–11–6 || 24
|- align="center" bgcolor="#ffbbbb"
| 27 || December 6, 2008 || Washington Capitals || 1–2 || Air Canada Centre || 19,416 || 9–12–6 || 24
|- align="center" bgcolor="#ccffcc"
| 28 || December 8, 2008 || New York Islanders || 4–2 || Air Canada Centre || 19,309 || 10–12–6 || 26
|- align="center" bgcolor="#ccffcc"
| 29 || December 12, 2008 || @ Buffalo Sabres || 2–1 || HSBC Arena || 18,211 || 11–12–6 || 28
|- align="center" bgcolor="#ccffcc"
| 30 || December 16, 2008 || New Jersey Devils || 3–2 (SO) || Air Canada Centre || 19,315 || 12–12–6 || 30
|- align="center" bgcolor="#ffbbbb"
| 31 || December 18, 2008 || @ Boston Bruins || 5–8  || TD Banknorth Garden || 17,565 || 12–13–6 || 30
|- align="center" bgcolor="#ccffcc"
| 32 || December 20, 2008 || @ Pittsburgh Penguins || 7–3 || Mellon Arena || 17,053 || 13–13–6 || 32
|- align="center" bgcolor="#ccffcc"
| 33 || December 22, 2008 || @ Atlanta Thrashers || 6–2 || Philips Arena || 16,413 || 14–13–6 || 34
|- align="center" bgcolor="#ffbbbb"
| 34 || December 23, 2008 || Dallas Stars || 2–8 || Air Canada Centre || 19,269 || 14–14–6 || 34
|- align="center" bgcolor="#ffbbbb"
| 35 || December 26, 2008 || @ New York Islanders  || 1–4 || Nassau Veterans Memorial Coliseum || 15,173 || 14–15–6 || 34
|- align="center" bgcolor="#ffbbbb"
| 36 || December 28, 2008 || @ Washington Capitals || 1–4 || Verizon Center || 18,277|| 14–16–6 || 34
|- align="center" bgcolor="#ccffcc"
| 37 || December 30, 2008 || Atlanta Thrashers || 4–3 (OT) || Air Canada Centre || 19,260 || 15–16–6 || 36
|-

|- align="center" bgcolor="#ffbbbb"
| 38 || January 1, 2009 || Buffalo Sabres || 1–4 || Air Canada Centre || 19,176 || 15–17–6 || 36
|- align="center" bgcolor="#ccffcc"
| 39 || January 3, 2009 || Ottawa Senators || 3–1 || Air Canada Centre || 19,406 || 16–17–6 || 38
|- align="center" bgcolor="#ffbbbb"
| 40 || January 6, 2009 || Florida Panthers || 2–4 || Air Canada Centre || 19,197 || 16–18–6 || 38
|- align="center" bgcolor="#ffbbbb"
| 41 || January 8, 2009 || @ Montreal Canadiens || 2–6 || Bell Centre || 21,273 || 16–19–6 || 38
|- align="center" bgcolor="#ffbbbb"
| 42 || January 10, 2009 || @ Philadelphia Flyers || 1–4 || Wachovia Center || 19,787 || 16–20–6 || 38
|- align="center" bgcolor="#ffbbbb"
| 43 || January 13, 2009 || Nashville Predators || 0–2 || Air Canada Centre || 19,223 || 16–21–6|| 38
|- align="center" bgcolor="#ccffcc"
| 44 || January 15, 2009 || @ Carolina Hurricanes || 6–4 || RBC Center || 18,037 || 17–21–6 || 40
|- align="center" bgcolor="#ffffff"
| 45 || January 16, 2009 || @ Atlanta Thrashers || 3–4 (OT) || Philips Arena || 15,619 || 17–21–7|| 41
|- align="center" bgcolor="#ffbbbb"
| 46 || January 19, 2009 || Carolina Hurricanes || 0–2 || Air Canada Centre || 19,018 || 17–22–7 || 41
|- align="center" bgcolor="#ffffff"
| 47 || January 21, 2009 || Boston Bruins || 3–4 (SO) || Air Canada Centre || 19,258 || 17–22–8 || 42
|- align="center" bgcolor="#ffbbbb"
| 48 || January 27, 2009 || @ Minnesota Wild || 1–6 || Xcel Energy Center || 18,568 || 17–23–8 || 42
|- align="center" bgcolor="#ccffcc"
| 49 || January 29, 2009 || @ Colorado Avalanche || 7–4 || Pepsi Center || 15,216 || 18–23–8 || 44
|- align="center" bgcolor="#ccffcc"
| 50 || January 31, 2009 || Pittsburgh Penguins || 5–4 || Air Canada Centre || 19,570 || 19–23–8 || 46
|- align="center" bgcolor="

|- align="center" bgcolor="#ffffff"
| 51 || February 3, 2009 || Florida Panthers || 3–4 (OT) || Air Canada Centre || 19,095 || 19–23–9 || 47
|- align="center" bgcolor="#ffbbbb"
| 52 || February 4, 2009 || @ Buffalo Sabres || 0–5 || HSBC Arena || 17,355 || 19–24–9 || 47
|- align="center" bgcolor="#ccffcc"
| 53 || February 7, 2009 || @ Montreal Canadiens || 5–2 || Bell Centre || 21,273 || 20–24–9 || 49
|- align="center" bgcolor="#ffffff"
| 54 || February 10, 2009 || @ Florida Panthers || 4–5 (OT)|| BankAtlantic Center || 13,764 || 20–24–10 || 50
|- align="center" bgcolor="#ffbbbb"
| 55 || February 12, 2009 || @ Tampa Bay || 4–6 || St. Pete Times Forum || 16,526 || 20–25–10 || 50
|- align="center" bgcolor="#ccffcc"
| 56 || February 14, 2009 || Pittsburgh Penguins || 6–2 || Air Canada Centre || 19,365 || 21–25–10 || 52
|- align="center" bgcolor="#ffbbbb"
| 57 || February 17, 2009 || Buffalo Sabres || 1–4 || Air Canada Centre || 19,287 || 21–26–10 || 52
|-align="center" bgcolor="#ffffff"
| 58 || February 19, 2009 || Columbus Blue Jackets || 3–4 (SO) || Air Canada Centre || 19,179 || 21–26–11 || 53
|-align="center" bgcolor="#ffffff"
| 59 || February 21, 2009 || Vancouver Canucks || 2–3 (SO) || Air Canada Centre || 19,504 || 21–26–12 || 54
|- align="center" bgcolor="#ccffcc"
| 60 || February 22, 2009 || @ New York Rangers || 3–2 (OT) || Madison Square Garden || 18,200 || 22–26–12 || 56
|- align="center" bgcolor="#ccffcc"
| 61 || February 25, 2009 || New York Rangers || 2–1 (SO) || Air Canada Centre || 19,383 || 23–26–12 || 58
|- align="center" bgcolor="#ccffcc"
| 62 || February 26, 2009 || @ New York Islanders || 5–4 (SO) || Nassau Veterans Memorial Coliseum || 12,201 || 24–26–12 || 60
|- align="center" bgcolor="#ccffcc"
| 63 || February 28, 2009 || @ Ottawa Senators || 4–3 (OT)|| Scotiabank Place || 20,050 || 25–26–12 || 62
|-

|- align="center" bgcolor="#ffffff"
| 64 || March 3, 2009 || New Jersey Devils || 2–3 (OT) || Air Canada Centre || 19,389 || 25–26–13 || 63
|- align="center" bgcolor="#ccffcc"
| 65 || March 5, 2009 || @ Washington Capitals || 2–1 || Verizon Center || 18,277 || 26–26–13 || 65
|- align="center" bgcolor="#ffbbbb"
| 66 || March 7, 2009 || Edmonton Oilers || 1–4 || Air Canada Centre || 19,364 || 26–27–13 || 65
|- align="center" bgcolor="#ffbbbb"
| 67 || March 9, 2009 || @ Ottawa Senators || 1–2 || Scotiabank Place || 18,898 || 26–28–13 || 65
|- align="center" bgcolor="#ccffcc"
| 68 || March 10, 2009 || New York Islanders || 3–2 (OT) || Air Canada Centre || 19,041 || 27–28–13 || 67
|- align="center" bgcolor="#ffbbbb"
| 69 || March 12, 2009 || Tampa Bay Lightning || 1–4 || Air Canada Centre || 19,209 || 27–29–13 || 67
|- align="center" bgcolor="#ccffcc"
| 70 || March 14, 2009 || Calgary Flames || 8–6 || Air Canada Centre || 19,356 || 28–29–13 || 69
|- align="center" bgcolor="#ccffcc"
| 71 || March 17, 2009 || @ Tampa Bay Lightning || 4–3 (SO) || St. Pete Times Forum || 18,793 || 29–29–13 || 71
|- align="center" bgcolor="#ffbbbb"
| 72 || March 19, 2009 || @ Florida Panthers || 1–3 || BankAtlantic Center || 15,467 || 29–30–13 || 71
|- align="center" bgcolor="#ccffcc"
| 73 || March 21, 2009 || @ Montreal Canadiens || 5–2 || Bell Centre || 21,273 || 30–30–13 || 73
|- align="center" bgcolor="#ccffcc"
| 74 || March 24, 2009 || Washington Capitals || 3–2 (SO) || Air Canada Centre || 19,362 || 31–30–13 || 75
|- align="center" bgcolor="#ffbbbb"
| 75 || March 27, 2009 || @ Buffalo Sabres || 3–5 || HSBC Arena || 18,620 || 31–31–13 || 75
|- align="center" bgcolor="#ffbbbb"
| 76 || March 28, 2009 || Boston Bruins || 5–7 || Air Canada Centre  || 19,360 || 31–32–13 || 75
|-

|- align="center" bgcolor="#ccffcc"
| 77 || April 1, 2009 || Philadelphia Flyers || 3–2 || Air Canada Centre || 19,340 || 32–32–13 || 77
|- align="center" bgcolor="#ffbbbb"
| 78 || April 3, 2009 || @ Philadelphia Flyers || 5–8 || Wachovia Center || 19,727 || 32–33–13|| 77
|- align="center" bgcolor="#ffbbbb"
| 79 || April 4, 2009 || Montreal Canadiens || 2–6 || Air Canada Centre || 19,516 || 32–34–13 || 77
|- align="center" bgcolor="#ccffcc"
| 80 || April 7, 2009 || @ New Jersey Devils || 4–1 || Prudential Center || 15,046 || 33–34–13 || 79
|- align="center" bgcolor="#ffbbbb"
| 81 || April 8, 2009 || Buffalo Sabres || 1–3 || Air Canada Centre || 19,516 || 33–35–13  || 79
|- align="center" bgcolor="#ccffcc"
| 82 || April 11, 2009 || Ottawa Senators || 5–2 || Air Canada Centre || 19,370 || 34–35–13 || 81
|-

|-
| † Hockey Hall of Fame Game
|-
| Schedule

Overtime statistics

Playoffs
The Toronto Maple Leafs failed to qualify for the 2009 Stanley Cup playoffs.

Player statistics
Final stats

Skaters

Goaltenders

†Denotes player spent time with another team before joining Maple Leafs. Stats reflect time with Maple Leafs only.
‡Traded mid-season.
Bold/italics denotes franchise record.

Awards and records

Records

Milestones

Transactions
On October 6, the team placed Mark Bell on waivers.

Trades

Free agents

Claimed from waivers

Draft picks
Toronto's picks at the 2008 NHL Entry Draft in Ottawa.

See also
 2008–09 NHL season

Farm teams
 The Maple Leafs continue their affiliation with the Toronto Marlies of the American Hockey League.

References

Toronto Maple Leafs seasons
Toronto Maple Leafs season, 2008-09
T